

Competitions

Friendlies

Liga I

League table

Results by round

Results summary

Matches

Cupa României

Players

Squad statistics

Transfers

In

Out

References

See also

ASC Oțelul Galați seasons
Otelul Galati